Les Rues-des-Vignes (called Vinchy in the Middle Ages) is a commune in the Nord department in northern France.

Vinchy was the site of a famous battle of the then-rising Charles Martel in spring 717.

See also
Communes of the Nord department

References

Communes of Nord (French department)